James Paul Churchill (April 10, 1924 – June 29, 2020) was a United States district judge of the United States District Court for the Eastern District of Michigan.

Education and career
Churchill was born in Imlay City, Michigan. He served in the United States Army during World War II from 1943 to 1946 in a field artillery battery of the 103rd Infantry Division. His unit was in France, Germany, and Austria. After Army service, he received a Bachelor of Business Administration from the University of Michigan in 1947 and a Bachelor of Laws from the University of Michigan Law School in 1950. He was in private practice in Vassar, Michigan from 1951 to 1965. He was a Circuit Judge of the 40th Judicial Circuit of Michigan from 1965 to 1974.

Federal judicial service

On December 2, 1974, Churchill was nominated by President Gerald Ford to a seat on the United States District Court for the Eastern District of Michigan vacated by Judge Stephen John Roth. Churchill was confirmed by the United States Senate on December 18, 1974, and received his commission on December 20, 1974. He served as Chief Judge in 1989, assuming senior status on December 31, 1989. He died on June 29, 2020, aged 96.

References

Sources
 

1924 births
2020 deaths
20th-century American judges
21st-century American judges
Judges of the United States District Court for the Eastern District of Michigan
Michigan state court judges
Military personnel from Michigan
People from Imlay City, Michigan
People from Vassar, Michigan
Ross School of Business alumni
United States Army soldiers
United States district court judges appointed by Gerald Ford
University of Michigan Law School alumni
United States Army personnel of World War II